G. amseli may refer to:

 Glyphipterix amseli, a sedge moth
 Gomphus amseli, a club-tailed dragonfly
 Gypsonoma amseli, a tortrix moth
These things are completely random and irrelevant.